The office of Paymaster of the Honourable Corps of Gentlemen at Arms and the office of Co-Paymaster of the Honourable Corps of Gentlemen at Arms, were offices created under the Great Seal. These offices were appointed under Letters Patent, which were mostly for the life of the office holder so appointed. The first appointment was on 30 October 1660.

List of Officers
30 October 1660   Sir Lewis Kirk
1 September 1664   John Kirk
1 December 1685   Sir William Thomas, 1st Baronet
4 April 1689   William Smythe esq.
31 May 1718   William Moore Smythe(1699–1746)  M.P.     Co-Paymaster
31 May 1718   James Moore Smythe      Co-Paymaster
31 May 1718   Arthur Moore Smythe         Co-Paymaster
1 May 1735   Sir Salisbury Cade
12 March 1761   C. Lloyd
29 June 1765   P. Cade
17 June 1799   R. Hunn
21 December 1803   William Gifford
2 May 1827   Sir William Boothby 8th Bart.

References
Index of Officers in Modern Britain Court Officers Vol. 11 1660–1837 pages 1265–1302 British Historyonline
Warrants for payments of money 1729 Vol. 1 page 240–252 by William A. Shaw 1897
Calendar of Treasury Books and Papers. 1735–1738 Vol.3 by William A. Shaw 1900 pages 145–155
Special Act of The House of Lords House of Lords Journal Vol. 23 April 1729 year pub. 1767–1830 pages 385–388

Honourable Corps of Gentlemen at Arms